Cichlisuite is the sixth EP by electronic music duo Autechre, released on August 26, 1997 by Warp Records. The EP was simultaneously released on CD and as two 12” records, all with unique cover art by The Designers Republic. Cichlisuite is Autechre's third release of 1997, following Chiastic Slide and the Envane EP.

The EP's title references the track "Cichli" (pronounced "sickly") from Chiastic Slide. All versions of the EP also include the statement “Mechanically Reclaimed by Autechre” on the cover, implying that the tracks are remixes, reworkings, or otherwise sourced from pre-existing material, though the statement is unclear. Autechre has said that several tracks on Cichlisuite were made entirely on the Nord Lead synthesizer, suggesting yet another meaning for the statement.

Track listing

References

1997 EPs
Autechre EPs
Warp (record label) EPs
Albums with cover art by The Designers Republic